Monster Café  is a Children's BBC comedy programme about three monsters working in Monster Café, where they meet weird monsters, serve weird food and battle with their evil boss, the Baroness. The series originally aired from 1994 to 1995.

The series was repeated on CBBC On Choice between 2000 and 2001, and on CBeebies in November 2007, but after complaints on the BBC Message Boards and direct to the BBC regarding how the programme "scared young children", it was pulled from the schedule after 4 episodes were shown.

Characters
Frankie played by Isobel Middleton

Frankie is a female robot who works at the café as the manageress. She is the smartest of the trio and uses many of the gadgets on her body to help out with problems and to sometimes fight the Baroness.

Igor played by David Shimwell

Igor is a 1-trillion-millenniums-old Transylvanian man who has very poor hygiene (but claims it's an old Transylvanian custom). He also works at the café as the cook, and loves making potions and other weird concoctions. He also has a pet dustbin called Vinny. Igor also has a short temper, when he gets angry he has a 'Monster Wobbly' where he breathes fire and throws saucepans and custard pies (which always hit Skull) at other monsters.

Mummy played by Toby Sedgwick

Mummy is a 6000-year-old Egyptian mummy who works at the café as the caretaker. He is very dim-witted and often gets stuff wrong. He also pronounces his Ms as Rs (So he called himself Rummy). Mummy sleeps in a coffin.

Baroness de Monstro played by Peta Lily

The Baroness is the bad-tempered boss of the monsters. She also hates the monsters having any kind of fun and meals being given away for free. She created Frankie to help her manage the café.

Minor characters
Vinny the Bin

Igor's pet dustbin, who acts very much like a dog and will eat anything.

Skull voiced and puppeteered by Simon Davies

A talking skull who lives in the Monster Café. He always tells incredibly bad jokes and is often mistreated, by being turned into a cabbage by the Baroness or having a custard pie thrown at him by Igor.

Chas played by Richard Ashton

Monster Café's best and favourite customer. Chas loves eating slugs and talks with a very strong Birmingham accent.

Marcel McCalla narrates the show.

Episodes

Series 1

Series 2

References

External links

BBC children's television shows
1990s British children's television series
1994 British television series debuts
1995 British television series endings
English-language television shows
British television shows featuring puppetry
Television series about monsters
Television series about mummies
Fictional coffeehouses and cafés
CBeebies
Television series by BBC Studios